The district of Glatz was a Prussian district in Silesia, which existed from 1742 to 1945. Its capital was the town of Glatz. Its territory is now part of the Polish Lower Silesian Voivodeship.

History 
After conquering most of Silesia, King Frederick the Great introduced Prussian administrative structures in Lower Silesia by cabinet order on 25 November 1741. This included the establishment of two war and domain chambers in Breslau and Glogau as well as their subdivision into districts and the appointment of district administrators on 1 January 1742.

The Glatz district initially belonged to the Breslau War and Domain Chamber until it was assigned to Regierungsbezirk Reichenbach of the Province of Silesia in the course of the Stein-Hardenberg reforms of 1815. On 1 January 1818 the new Habelschwerdt district was formed from parts of the Glatz district.  After Regierungsbezirk Reichenbach was dissolved, the districts of Glatz and Habelschwerdt were assigned to Regierungsbezirk Breslau on 1 May 1820. On 2 August 1855 the new Neurode district was created from the northern parts of the Glatz district with its capital in the city of Neurode.

On 8 November 1919 the Province of Silesia was divided into two parts and the Glatz district became part of the new Province of Lower Silesia, which was formed from Regierungsbezirk Breslau and Regierungsbezirk Liegnitz. On 1 October 1932 the Neurode district was merged back into the Glatz district. On 1 April 1938 the Prussian provinces of Lower Silesia and Province of Upper Silesia were merged again to form the Province of Silesia, but this was reversed on 18 January 1941. In the spring of 1945 the district was occupied by the Red Army and in the summer of 1945, it was placed under Polish administration in accordance with the Potsdam Agreement.

Demographics 
According to the census of 1861, the Glatz district had a population of 56,584, of which 52,968 (93.6%) were Germans and 3,616 (6.4%) were Czechs.

References 

1945 disestablishments
1742 establishments
Kłodzko County